Eulimella is a genus of sea snails, marine gastropod mollusks in the family Pyramidellidae, the pyrams and their allies.

The subgenus name Ptycheulimella Sacco, 1892 or Turbonilla (Ptycheulimella) Sacco, 1892 has been used to describe species whose shells show a weak fold on the columella and frequently a brownish spiral band. Van Aartsen decided not to subdivide Eulimella s.l. because of the uncertainty of the identification of the type species of this subgenus compared with Tornatella pyramidata Deshayes, 183

Description
Many species are poorly known. The elongated, turriculate shells are small, mostly under 1 cm. They are somewhat glossy and show no sculpture except a few microscopic growth lines. The teleoconch has numerous whorls. The apex is sinistral. The aperture is subquadrangular. The outer lip is not continuous. The columella is straight, without plications. They lack a columellar tooth.

The  animal has short tentacles. The mentum, a thin projection below the mouth, is lobed in front. The anterior extremity of the foot is truncated.

This family was described by Peñas A. & Rolán E. in 1997  and again in 2000. Van Aartsen et al. gave in 1988 a stable nomenclature of the genus

Notes
Additional information regarding this genus:
 Authority: Authority of Octopus  in Vaught, K.C.  et al. (1989). A classification of the Living Mollusca. American  Malacologists: Melbourne, FL (USA). XII, 195 pp.t   is Jeffreys, 1847.For the authority we followed ITIS database

Species
Species within the genus Eulimella include:

 Eulimella abdita Peñas & Rolán, 2016
 Eulimella accesa Peñas & Rolán, 2016
 Eulimella acicula (Philippi, 1836)
 Eulimella acusacuta Peñas & Rolán, 2016
 Eulimella acusangusta Peñas & Rolán, 1997
 Eulimella acutiformis Peñas & Rolán, 2016
 Eulimella aeaea Melvill, 1904
 Eulimella aequatorialis Thiele, 1925
 Eulimella alexandrinoi Peñas, Rolán & Swinnen, 2019
 † Eulimella alpha Laws, 1938 
 Eulimella analogica Peñas & Rolán, 2016
 Eulimella angeli Peñas & Rolán, 1997
 Eulimella annulata Thiele, 1925
 Eulimella arabica Issel, 1869
 Eulimella arcta Peñas & Rolán, 2016
 Eulimella ataktos Warén, 1991
 Eulimella atlantis (Peñas & Rolán, 1999)
 Eulimella aureosuturalis Peñas & Rolán, 2016
 Eulimella aurifasciata Peñas & Rolán, 2016
 † Eulimella awamoaensis P. Marshall & Murdoch, 1921 
 Eulimella bacillus Thiele, 1925
 † Eulimella beta Laws, 1938 
 Eulimella bicolor Peñas & Rolán, 2016
 Eulimella bogii van Aartsen, 1995
 Eulimella boydae van Aartsen, Gittenberger & Goud, 2000
 Eulimella brevisutura Peñas & Rolán, 2016
 Eulimella carmanica Melvill, 1903
 Eulimella carminae (Peñas & Micali, 1999)
 Eulimella cerullii (Cossmann, 1916)
 Eulimella clarae Peñas & Rolán, 2016
 Eulimella clemam Peñas & Rolán, 2016
 Eulimella coena Webster, 1905 
 Eulimella colorata Peñas & Rolán, 2016
 Eulimella columnella Thiele, 1925
 Eulimella comparabilis Peñas & Rolán, 2016
 Eulimella cossignaniorum van Aartsen, 1995
 † Eulimella coxi Laws, 1938 
 Eulimella coysmani Peñas, Rolán & Swinnen, 2014
 Eulimella cultriformis Peñas & Rolán, 2016
 Eulimella cylindrata Pimenta, Santos & Absalão, 2011
 Eulimella cylindriformis Peñas & Rolán, 2016
 Eulimella cyrtoconoidea Peñas & Rolán, 2016
 Eulimella demissa Peñas & Rolán, 2016
 † Eulimella deplexa Hutton, 1885 
 Eulimella depressa Peñas & Rolán, 2016
 † Eulimella dianeae Landau & LaFolette, 2015 
 Eulimella digenes (Dautzenberg & Fischer, 1896)
 Eulimella discapex Peñas & Rolán, 2016
 Eulimella disciformis Peñas & Rolán, 2016
 Eulimella edentula Peñas & Rolán, 2016
 Eulimella egeria Melvill, 1912
 Eulimella ejuncida Pimenta, Santos & Absalão, 2011
 Eulimella erecta Thiele, 1925
 Eulimella eulimoides (Nomura, 1936)
 Eulimella excellens Peñas & Rolán, 2016
 Eulimella famelica Peñas & Rolán, 2016
 Eulimella finitima Peñas & Rolán, 2016
 Eulimella flavinfula Peñas & Rolán, 2016
 Eulimella flavocincta Peñas & Rolán, 2016
 Eulimella fontanae van Aartsen, Gittenberger & Goud, 2000
 Eulimella fractapex Peñas & Rolán, 2016
 Eulimella frielei Høisaeter, 2014
 Eulimella fulgens Thiele, 1925
 Eulimella funicula Peñas & Rolán, 2016
 Eulimella gabonensis Peñas, Rolán & Swinnen, 2014
 Eulimella gedrosica Melvill, 1904
 Eulimella giribeti Peñas & Rolán, 1997
 Eulimella gofasi (Schander, 1994)
 Eulimella grandis Peñas & Rolán, 2016
 Eulimella herosae van Aartsen, Gittenberger & Goud, 2000
 Eulimella hinomotoensis Nomura, 1938
  † Eulimella imitator Laws, 1939
 Eulimella inclinata Peñas & Rolán, 2016
 Eulimella infrafasciata Peñas & Rolán, 2016
 Eulimella inoperta Peñas & Rolán, 2016
 Eulimella interconvexa Peñas & Rolán, 2016
 Eulimella iusta Moreno, Peñas & Rolán, 2003
 Eulimella juliae Peñas & Rolán, 2002
 Eulimella kaasi (Aartsen, Gittenberger & Goud, 2000)
  † Eulimella kaawaensis Laws, 1940
 Eulimella kaisensis Melvill, 1898
  † Eulimella kempi Grant-Mackie & Chapman-Smith, 1971 
 Eulimella kobelti (Dautzenberg, 1912)
 † Eulimella komitica Laws, 1939 
 Eulimella lacrimaeformae Peñas & Rolán, 2016
 Eulimella lagoenaeformis Peñas & Rolán, 2016
 Eulimella lanceolata Peñas & Rolán, 2016
 † Eulimella lanotensis Lozouet, 1998 
 † Eulimella larga Laws, 1938 
 Eulimella levidensis Peñas & Rolán, 1997
 Eulimella levilirata Murdoch & Suter, 1906 
 Eulimella limbata (Suter, 1907) 
 Eulimella lissa A. E. Verrill, 1884
 Eulimella livida Peñas & Rolán, 2016
 Eulimella lomana (Dall, 1908)
 Eulimella longiuscula Peñas & Rolán, 2016
 Eulimella magna Peñas & Rolán, 2016
 Eulimella maia Melvill, 1910
 Eulimella marmorea Hori & Tsuchida, 1996
 Eulimella marquesensis Peñas & Rolán, 2016
  † Eulimella media (Hutton, 1885)
 Eulimella mersa Peñas & Rolán, 2016
  † Eulimella mestayerae (Marwick, 1931) 
 Eulimella micra Peñas & Rolán, 2016
 Eulimella minima Peñas & Rolán, 2016
 Eulimella minisudis Peñas & Rolán, 2016
 Eulimella minisutura Peñas & Rolán, 2016
 Eulimella monicae Peñas, Rolán & Swinnen, 2019
 Eulimella nana Locard, 1897
 Eulimella neoattenuata (Gaglini, 1992)
 Eulimella niasensis Thiele, 1925
 Eulimella nona Peñas & Rolán, 2016
 Eulimella novacaledonica Peñas & Rolán, 2016
 Eulimella oliveri Peñas & Rolán, 2006
 Eulimella opaca A. Adams, 1861
 Eulimella opalina A. Adams, 1861
 Eulimella ortizae Peñas & Rolán, 2000
 Eulimella padangensis Thiele, 1925
 † Eulimella parlimbata Laws, 1939 
 Eulimella parva Peñas & Rolán, 2016
 Eulimella parvacuta Peñas & Rolán, 2016
 Eulimella parvitas Peñas & Rolán, 2016
 Eulimella parvulissima Peñas & Rolán, 2016
 Eulimella paucispiralis Peñas & Rolán, 2016
 Eulimella paucisulcata Peñas & Rolán, 1997
 Eulimella pellucens A. Adams, 1861 
 Eulimella penedesensis Moreno, Peñas & Rolán, 2003
 Eulimella perfiliformis Peñas & Rolán, 2016
 Eulimella pergracilis Peñas & Rolán, 2016
 Eulimella perinde Peñas & Rolán, 2016
 Eulimella perstriata Peñas & Rolán, 2016
 Eulimella perturbata Peñas, Rolán & Swinnen, 2014
 Eulimella phaula (Dautzenberg & Fischer H., 1896)
 Eulimella philippinensis Peñas & Rolán, 2016
 Eulimella pinna Peñas & Rolán, 2016
 Eulimella polita (A. E. Verrill, 1872) (invalid: junior homonym of Eulimella polita de Folin, 1870; no substitute name available)
 Eulimella polita de Folin, 1870
 Eulimella polygyrata Dautzenberg, 1912
 Eulimella porrecta Peñas & Rolán, 2016
 Eulimella postera Peñas & Rolán, 2016
 Eulimella praeclara Thiele, 1925
 Eulimella pressa Peñas & Rolán, 2016
 Eulimella primorum Peñas & Rolán, 2016
 Eulimella procera Peñas & Rolán, 2016
 Eulimella producta Peñas & Rolán, 2016
 Eulimella profunda Peñas & Rolán, 2016
 Eulimella propeacuta Peñas & Rolán, 2016
 Eulimella prosoclina Peñas & Rolán, 2016
 Eulimella protofunis (Peñas & Rolán, 1999)
 Eulimella proventa Peñas & Rolán, 2016
 Eulimella pseudoturbonilla Peñas & Rolán, 2016
 Eulimella punctistriata Peñas & Rolán, 2016
 Eulimella pyrgoidella Saurin, 1959
 Eulimella pyrgoides Dautzenberg & Fischer, 1906
 Eulimella quadrasi Boettger, 1893
 Eulimella repetitio Peñas & Rolán, 2016
 Eulimella robusta van Aartsen, Gittenberger E. & Goud, 1998
 Eulimella rudis Watson, 1886
 Eulimella rugata Peñas & Rolán, 2016
 Eulimella scalaris Peñas & Rolán, 2016
 Eulimella sceptrum Thiele, 1925
 Eulimella scillae (Scacchi, 1835)
 Eulimella scita Peñas & Rolán, 2016
 Eulimella semen Peñas & Rolán, 2016
 Eulimella shelaghae van Aartsen, Gittenberger & Goud, 2000
 Eulimella siamensis Robba, Di Geronimo, Chaimanee, Negri & Sanfilippo, 2004
 Eulimella siberutensis Thiele, 1925
 Eulimella sibogae Schepman, 1909
 Eulimella similebala Penas & Rolan, 1999
 Eulimella similminuta Peñas & Rolán, 1997
 Eulimella simplex (d'Orbigny, 1841)
 Eulimella sinuata van Aartsen, Gittenberger & Goud, 1998
 Eulimella smithii (A. E. Verrill, 1880)
 Eulimella solita Peñas, Rolán & Swinnen, 2014
 Eulimella solomonensis Peñas & Rolán, 2016
 Eulimella spicularis Peñas & Rolán, 2016
 Eulimella squarrosula Melvill, 1918 
 Eulimella striatissima Peñas & Rolán, 2016
 Eulimella subcarina (Laseron, 1959)
 Eulimella subcurvata Peñas & Rolán, 2016
 Eulimella subincurvata Peñas & Rolán, 2016
 Eulimella subobtusa Peñas & Rolán, 2016
 Eulimella subscalaris Peñas & Rolán, 2016
 Eulimella sudis (Peñas & Rolán, 1999)
 Eulimella sumatrensis Thiele, 1925
 Eulimella syrnoloides Peñas & Rolán, 2016
 Eulimella talea Peñas, Rolán & Swinnen, 2014
 † Eulimella tampaensis Bartsch, 1955 
 Eulimella tantula Peñas & Rolán, 2016
 Eulimella telum Schander, 1994
 Eulimella thalensis Robba, Di Geronimo, Chaimanee, Negri & Sanfilippo, 2004
 Eulimella torquata Pimenta, Santos & Absalão, 2011
 Eulimella toshikazui Hori & Fukuda, 1999
 Eulimella trewae van Aartsen, Gittenberger E. & Goud, 2000
 Eulimella troncosoi Peñas, Rolán & Swinnen, 2014
 Eulimella tydemani van Aartsen, Gittenberger & Goud, 1998
 Eulimella undata Peñas & Rolán, 2016
 Eulimella uniuspecei Peñas & Rolán, 2016
 Eulimella vanderlandi van Aartsen, Gittenberger & Goud, 2000
 Eulimella varia Peñas & Rolán, 2016
 Eulimella variabilis de Folin, 1870
 Eulimella vegrandis Peñas & Rolán, 2016
 Eulimella ventricosa (Forbes, 1844)
 Eulimella venusta Melvill, 1904
 Eulimella vitrea A. Adams, 1861
 Eulimella voluminis Peñas & Rolán, 2016
  † Eulimella waihoraensis (Marwick, 1931)
 Eulimella zornikulla Schander, 1994

According to a study published in November 2011 in Zootaxa, the following species do not belong in Eulimella:
 Eulimella argentina Doello-Jurado, 1938 : synonym of Turbonilla argentina (Doello-Jurado, 1938)
 Eulimella bahiensis Castellanos, 1982: synonym of Turbonilla bahiensis (Castellanos, 1982)

The following species were brought into synonymy:

 Eulimella aciculata Locard, 1886: synonym of Eulimella acicula (Philippi, 1836)
 Eulimella alba Calkins, 1878: synonym of Melanella conoidea (Kurtz & Stimpson, 1851)
 Eulimella amoebaea (Watson, 1886): synonym of Hamarilla amoebaea (R. B. Watson, 1886)
 Eulimella anabathron Hedley, 1906: synonym of Murchisonella anabathron (Hedley, 1906)
 Eulimella angusta Watson, 1886: synonym of Eulimostraca angusta (Watson, 1886)
 Eulimella argentina Doello-Jurado, 1938: synonym of Turbonilla argentina (Doello-Jurado, 1938)
 Eulimella bahiensis Castellanos, 1982: synonym of Turbonilla bahiensis (Castellanos, 1982)
 Eulimella buijsi van Aartsen, Gittenberger & Goud, 2000: synonym of Koloonella buijsi (van Aartsen, Gittenberger & Goud, 2000)
 Eulimella calva Schander, 1994: synonym of Koloonella calva (Schander, 1994)
 Eulimella carinata (Folin, 1870): synonym of Bacteridium carinatum (de Folin, 1870)
 Eulimella chariessa (Verrill, 1884): synonym of Melanella chariessa (A. E. Verrill, 1884)
 Eulimella chasteri Dautzenberg, 1912: synonym of Eulimella variabilis de Folin, 1870
 Eulimella cingulata Issel, 1869: synonym of Cingulina isseli (Tryon, 1886)
 Eulimella clavula Lovén, 1846: synonym of Liostomia clavula (Lovén, 1846)
 Eulimella coacta Watson, 1886: synonym of Koloonella coacta (Watson, 1886)
 Eulimella columna Hedley, 1907: synonym of Murchisonella columna (Hedley, 1907)
 Eulimella commutata Monterosato, 1884: synonym of Eulimella acicula (Philippi, 1836)
 Eulimella compactilis (Jeffreys, 1867): synonym of Eulimella acicula (Philippi, 1836)
 Eulimella compactilis Locard, 1892: synonym of Melanella compactilis (Locard, 1892)
 Eulimella cossignanii van Aartsen, 1995: synonym of Eulimella cossignaniorum van Aartsen, 1995
 Eulimella curtata Coen, 1933: synonym of Eulimella acicula (Philippi, 1836)
 Eulimella diaphana A. Adams, 1861: synonym of Ebalina diaphana (A. Adams, 1861)
 Eulimella eburnea Stimpson, 1851: synonym of Liostomia eburnea (Stimpson, 1851)
 Eulimella electa Jeffreys, 1883: synonym of Liostomia electa (Jeffreys, 1883)
 Eulimella endolamellata Schander, 1994: synonym of Syrnola endolamellata (Schander, 1994)
 Eulimella flagellum Coen, 1933: synonym of Eulimella acicula (Philippi, 1836)
 Eulimella folini P. Fischer in de Folin, 1869: synonym of Ebala striatula (Jeffreys, 1856)
 Eulimella gracilis Jeffreys, 1847: synonym of Eulimella ventricosa (Forbes, 1844)
 Eulimella hasta Laseron, 1951: synonym of Koloonella hasta (Laseron, 1951)
 Eulimella ignorabilis Peñas & Rolán, 1997: synonym of Koloonella ignorabilis (Peñas & Rolán, 1997)
 Eulimella inanis Dautzenberg, 1912: synonym of Eulimella kobelti (Dautzenberg, 1912)
 Eulimella inexpectata (Oliver, 1915): synonym of Raoulostraca inexpectata W. R. B. Oliver, 1915
 Eulimella laevis (Brown, 1827): synonym of Eulimella acicula (Philippi, 1836)
 Eulimella larochei Powell, 1930: synonym of Terelimella larochei (Powell, 1930)
 Eulimella laxa Watson, 1886: synonym of Koloonella laxa (Watson, 1886) 
 Eulimella levissima de Folin, 1870: synonym of Cima minima (Jeffreys, 1858)
 Eulimella lucida Verrill, 1884: synonym of Melanella lucida (Verrill, 1884)
 Eulimella macandrei (Forbes, 1844): synonym of Eulimella scillae (Scacchi, 1835)
 Eulimella minor E. A. Smith, 1904: synonym of Pyramidella minor (E. A. Smith, 1904)
 Eulimella minuta (H. Adams, 1869): synonym of Syrnola minuta Adams H., 1869
 Eulimella minutissima Laseron, 1951: synonym of Koloonella minutissima (Laseron, 1951)
 Eulimella moniliforme Hedley & Musson, 1891: synonym of Koloonella moniliformis (Hedley & Musson, 1891)
 Eulimella moniliformis Hedley & Musson, 1891: synonym of Koloonella moniliformis (Hedley & Musson, 1891)
 Eulimella monolirata de Folin, 1874: synonym of Eulimella perturbata Peñas, Rolán & Swinnen, 2014
 Eulimella nitida Verrill, 1884: synonym of Halielloides nitidus (Verrill, 1884)
 Eulimella nitidissima : synonym of Ebala nitidissima (Montagu, 1803)
 Eulimella nivea E. A. Smith, 1904: synonym of Syrnola aganea (Bartsch, 1915)
 Eulimella nomurai Ozaki, 1958: synonym of Tachyrhynchus nomurai (Ozaki, 1958)
 Eulimella obeliscus Jeffreys, 1858: synonym of Eulimella ventricosa (Forbes, 1844)
 Eulimella occidentalis Hemphill, 1894: synonym of Murchisonella occidentalis (Hemphill, 1894)
 Eulimella parvula Thiele, 1925: synonym of Puposyrnola dorothea van Aartsen & Corgan, 1996
 Eulimella philippiana Dunker, 1860: synonym of Hypermastus philippiana (Dunker, 1860)
 Eulimella praelonga (Jeffreys, 1884): synonym of Eulimella cerullii (Cossmann, 1916)
 Eulimella schlumbergeri (Dautzenberg & Fischer, 1896): synonym of Turbonilla schlumbergeri Dautzenberg & H. Fischer, 1896
 Eulimella similiebala [sic] : synonym of Eulimella similebala Peñas & Rolán, 1999
 Eulimella striata de Folin, 1870: synonym of Ebala nitidissima (Montagu, 1803)
 Eulimella striata de Folin, 1870: synonym of Ebala pointeli (de Folin, 1868)
 Eulimella striatula Jeffreys, 1856: synonym of Ebala striatula (Jeffreys, 1856)
 Eulimella subcylindrica Dunker in Weinkauff, 1862: synonym of Eulimella acicula (Philippi, 1836)
 Eulimella subtilis Watson, 1886: synonym of Koloonella subtilis (Watson, 1886) 
 Eulimella tenuis G.B. Sowerby III, 1894: synonym of Visma sowerbyi van Aartsen & Corgan, 1996
 Eulimella tenuis de Folin, 1870: synonym of Ebala pointeli (de Folin, 1868)
 Eulimella tomacula Laseron, 1951: synonym of Koloonella tomacula (Laseron, 1951)
 Eulimella trigonostoma de Folin, 1872: synonym of Ebala gradata (Monterosato, 1878)
 Eulimella turrita (Petterd, 1884): synonym of Koloonella turrita (Petterd, 1884)
 Eulimella turritellata (Requien, 1848): synonym of Eulimella gracilis Jeffreys, 1847
 Eulimella unifasciata (Forbes, 1844): synonym of Tibersyrnola unifasciata (Forbes, 1844)
 Eulimella vanhareni (van Aartsen, Gittenberger & Goud, 1998): synonym of Syrnola vanhareni (van Aartsen, Gittenberger & Goud, 1998)
 Eulimella venusta Melvill, 1904: synonym of Ebala venusta (Melvill, 1904)
 Eulimella verduini van Aartsen, Gittenberger & Goud, 1998: synonym of Eulimella neoattenuata (Gaglini, 1992)
 Eulimella xenophyes (Melvill & Standen, 1912): synonym of Atomiscala xenophyes (Melvill & Standen, 1912)

The following species are nomina dubia (names of unknown or doubtful application):
 Eulimella superflua (Monterosato, 1875) (nomen dubium)
 Eulimella turris (Forbes, 1844) (nomen dubium)

References

 ALEXANDRE DIAS PIMENTA, FRANKLIN NOEL DOS SANTOS & RICARDO SILVA ABSALÃO, Taxonomic revision of the genus Eulimella (Gastropoda, Pyramidellidae) from Brazil, with description of three new species; Zootaxa 3063: 22–38 (2011), ISSN 1175-5334
 Aartsen, J.J. van, 1994. European Pyramidellidae: IV. The genera Eulimella, Anisocycla, Syrnola, Cingulina, Oscilla and Careliopsis.— Bull , malac. 30: 85-109.
 Pimenta, A.D., Santos, F.N. & Absalao, R.S., 2011. Taxonomic revision of the genus Eulimella (Gastropoda, Pyramidellidae) from Brazil, with description of three new species. Zootaxa 3063: 22-38
  Peñas A. & Rolán E., 2016. Deep water Pyramidelloidea from the central and South Pacific. 3. The tribes Eulimellini and Syrnolini., p. 1-304

External links
 To GenBank
 To ITIS
 To World Register of Marine Species

 
Pyramidellidae